Bear Cove is a rural community of the Halifax Regional Municipality in the Canadian province of Nova Scotia on the Chebucto Peninsula.

References
 Explore HRM
Bear Cove on Destination Nova Scotia

Communities in Halifax, Nova Scotia